Carol Selman is a historian, writer, and teacher who has served on the New Jersey Historical Commission, the state agency that preserve the historical record of the state. She chaired the commission's Committee on Publications and served on its Committee on Grants and Prizes. Selman has also served as a fellow of the National Endowment for the Humanities in American urban history, and as an educational consultant for the Newark Museum in Newark, New Jersey. In 2012, 
the New Jersey Library Association awarded her and Sharon Adarlo their Journalism Award for coverage of events in Newark.

Early life, education, and teaching career

Selman graduated from the Beard School (now Morristown-Beard School) in Orange, New Jersey in 1964. She completed a bachelor's degree in history at Cornell University in Ithaca, New York in 1968 and earned induction into Phi Beta Kappa. During her senior year, Selman did a guest study program at Barnard College in New York City. She later taught history and art history at Millburn High School in Millburn, New Jersey. While teaching at the school, Selman launched its Advanced Placement course in U.S. history and helped create the system of classes for history electives. She also earned a master's degree in American studies from Stony Brook University in Oyster Bay, New York.

Historical commissions

In 1992, New Jersey Governor James Florio appointed Selman to the New Jersey Historical Commission. After her appointment received confirmation from the New Jersey Senate, Selman served on the commission through the administration of Governor Donald DiFrancesco (10 years). In 2001, she presented on the history of New York City and its impact on the growth of New Jersey at the "Then to Now" event at West Orange High School. That year, Selman made a guest appearance on the show "All Things Considered" on National Public Radio to discuss the history of household medicine. Selman has also served as the vice chair of the West Orange Arts Council,  and as a member of the West Orange Historical Preservation Commission in West Orange, New Jersey.

Family

Selman's husband, Bob DeVos, is a jazz musician. DeVos toured with Frankie Valli and the Four Seasons as a guitarist during his teenage years.

References

American women historians
21st-century American historians
Cornell University alumni
Stony Brook University alumni
Barnard College alumni
People from West Orange, New Jersey
Living people
Morristown-Beard School alumni
21st-century American women writers
Year of birth missing (living people)
Historians from New Jersey